Private banks are banks owned by either the individual or a general partner(s) with limited partner(s). Private banks are not incorporated. In any such case, creditors can look to both the "entirety of the bank's assets" as well as the entirety of the sole-proprietor's/general-partners' assets.

These banks have a long tradition in Switzerland, dating back to at least the Revocation of the Edict of Nantes (1685). Private banks also have a long tradition in the UK where C. Hoare & Co. has been in business since 1672.

Notable private banks 
This list contains two types of banks:
 Unincorporated banks owned by either an individual or a general partner(s) with limited partner(s).
 Incorporated banks specialized in wealth management for high-net-worth individuals.

China 
Bank of Communications, founded in 1908
China Merchants Bank

France 
 Compagnie Financière Edmond de Rothschild, Paris, founded in 1953; a member of Edmond de Rothschild Group
 Société Générale

Germany 

 Delbruck Bethmann Maffei, Frankfurt, founded in 1748; a member of ABN AMRO
 M. M. Warburg & Co., Hamburg, founded in 1798
 Sal. Oppenheim, Cologne, founded in 1789; a member of Deutsche Bank

Italy 
 Banca Sella Group, founded in 1886.

Liechtenstein 
 LGT Bank, Vaduz, founded in 1920; owned by Princely Family of Liechtenstein

Netherlands 
 Maduro & Curiel's Bank, Willemstad, Curacao founded in 1917
 MeesPierson, Rotterdam, founded in 1720: a member of ABN AMRO
 Van Lanschot Kempen, founded in 1737. It is the oldest independent bank in the Netherlands and the Benelux and one of the oldest independent banks in the world.

Switzerland 
 Banque privée Edmond de Rothschild, Geneva, founded in 1923; a member of Edmond de Rothschild Group
 Baumann & Cie, Banquiers, Basel, founded in 1920
 EFG International, Zurich, founded in 1995; a member of EFG Group, Geneva 
Hyposwiss Private Bank Genève SA, founded in 1889
 Julius Baer, Zurich, founded in 1890
 La Roche & Co., Basel, founded in 1787
 Landolt & Cie, Lausanne, founded in 1780
 Lombard Odier & Cie, Geneva, founded in 1796
 Pictet & Cie, Geneva, founded in 1805
 Union Bancaire Privée, Geneva, founded in 1969
 MBaer Merchant Bank AG, Zurich, founded in 2018

United Kingdom 
 Arbuthnot Latham & Co., London, founded in 1833
 Brown Shipley, London, founded in 1810; a member of KBL epb Group
 Cater Allen, London, founded in 1816: a member of Santander
 Child & Co., London, founded in 1664; a member of NatWest Group
 C. Hoare & Co., London, founded in 1672
 Coutts & Co., London, founded in 1692; a member of NatWest Group
 Hampden & Co., Edinburgh, founded in 2015
 Weatherbys, Established in 1770 as a bank to the horse racing industry, now based in Northamptonshire

United States 

 Brown Brothers Harriman & Co., New York City, founded in 1818

See also
Bank secrecy
Family office
Offshore bank
Private banks
Public bank
Swiss bank

References

External links
Swiss Private Bankers Association

 
Banks